Loxopamea is a genus of moths of the family Noctuidae.

Species
 Loxopamea albitracta Hreblay & Plante, 1995

References
Natural History Museum Lepidoptera genus database
Loxopamea at funet

Xyleninae